Yuriy Oleksandrovych Krymarenko (born August 11, 1983) is a Ukrainian high jumper. His personal best performance is 2.33 m.

Career
Krymarenko won a gold medal in the 2005 World Championships in Athletics, clearing the height of 2.32 m which was the lowest winning result for men's high jump since 1983. The favorites of the contest, most notably Swede Stefan Holm, failed to jump over more than 2.29 m. Krymarenko had started the 2005 season with a silver medal in the European Under 23 Championships in Erfurt, Germany, where he was beaten by the Czech Republic's Jaroslav Bába.

He finished 33rd in the 2008 Summer Olympics with a jump of 2.15 m.

Competition record

References

External links 
 Official site of Krymarenko Yurij
 

1983 births
Living people
Ukrainian male high jumpers
Olympic athletes of Ukraine
Athletes (track and field) at the 2008 Summer Olympics
World Athletics Championships medalists
World Athletics Championships athletes for Ukraine
World Athletics Championships winners
Competitors at the 2005 Summer Universiade
21st-century Ukrainian people